Evelyn Roth (born December 27, 1936) is an interdisciplinary artist who has worked in the areas of textiles, sculpture, performance, dance and interactive fabric arts. She specializes in environmentally sensitive events, festivals, school programs and art gallery exhibits. Roth is based in the town of Maslin Beach, on South Australia's Fleurieu Peninsula.

Early life 
Evelyn Margaret Yakubow was born in 1936 in Mundare, Alberta. She moved to Edmonton, Alberta in the 1950s where she took classes in art, crafts, modern, eastern and classical dance. She also took yoga and fencing classes while working in the local children's library. In 1961, she and her husband Klaus Roth moved to Vancouver where she worked in the university library. The Roths went their separate ways in the late 1960s.

Career 
When she moved to Vancouver in 1961, Evelyn Roth joined Intermedia and became a key practitioner in the international art scene at the time focusing on art and technology, wearable art and video art.  During the 1970s Roth focused her practice on knitting and crocheting with recycled materials including video tape and natural fibres. She created wearable art, textile installations and furnishings. In 1974, her book about her work, The Evelyn Roth Recycling Book, was published by Talonbooks. That same year, she joined the British Columbia pavilion at Expo '74, presenting under a sunsail made of woven computer tapes and videotape. She often adapted the motif of wearables, fabricating work from found materials and ingeniously using them in various festivals, events or exhibitions.

From 1973 through the 1980s Roth explored the intersections of sculpture, dance and the environment and formed the Evelyn Roth Moving Sculpture Company. A film Woven in Time was created in 1977 that features Roth's textile work and shows the company in various outdoor settings. Her work became a catalyst for many creators with a wide variety of interests in different countries.

Her first trip to Australia was in 1979. In 1981, she was invited to install an interactive display at the Adelaide Festival Centre Foyer which she created out of discarded TV programs (titled Under the Billabong There Lives A Salmon), then returned to South Australia to work with Pitjitjanjara communities and held workshops in rabbit knit and painted leather garments, as well as crocheting a shade canopy from discarded video tape and play web from nylon. The first showing of Nylon Zoo in Australia was in 1982 at the 1982 Commonwealth Games in Brisbane. In 1990, she set up the Evelyn Roth Celebration Centre – Point Roberts, USA (artist' studios, art gallery and performance space) This large studio allowed her to expand inflatable structures into mazes, set up a FestivalArts website and to promote her work worldwide. In 2003, Evelyn Roth's Wearable Art, 1971 to 2003, was held at the Australian National University, Canberra, Australia. Her work is in the collections of the Vancouver Art Gallery and Surrey Art Gallery, British Columbia.

Roth has lived and worked in Australia since 1996. She has an annual residency with the Storybook Theatre Company in Hawaii.

Exhibitions/Festivals 
Roth has been featured in many solo exhibitions over the years and participated in various festivals and group exhibitions.

Solo exhibitions 

 1976 – Nylon Zoo at Habitat Forum, Vancouver
 1977 – Salmon Dance (narration by Hannelore) on the Queen Charlotte Islands
 1981 – Under The Billabong There Lives A Salmon at the Adelaide Festival Centre, South Australia
 September 29 to November 7, 1993 – Salmon Run at the Surrey Art Gallery

Group exhibitions 

 October 30, 2015, to January 10, 2016 – Between Object and Action: Transforming Media in the 1960s and 70's at the Vancouver Art Gallery
 October 24, 2015, to February 28, 2016 – Hippie Modernism: The Struggle for Utopia at the Walker Art Center
January 12 to April 8, 2018 – Beginning with the Seventies: GLUT at the Morris and Helen Belkin Art Gallery, Vancouver, B.C.

Awards 
In 1973, she was awarded Artist of the Year by the Vancouver Sun. In 1999 and 2006, Roth won the World of Wearable Art international design competition in New Zealand.

Personal life 
She is married to Australian artist John F. Davis.

References

Bibliography

External links 
 Official website

Canadian women artists
Artists from Alberta
Canadian textile artists
Women textile artists
Environmental artists
1936 births
Living people
Canadian expatriates in Australia